France competed at the 2002 Winter Paralympics in Salt Lake City, United States. 18 competitors from France won 19 medals, including 2 gold, 11 silver and 6 bronze and finished 13th in the medal table.

See also 
 France at the Paralympics
 France at the 2002 Winter Olympics

References 

France at the Paralympics
2002 in French sport
Nations at the 2002 Winter Paralympics